Apurtuarte Club is a Spanish football team based in Erandio in the autonomous community of Vizcaya. Founded in 1926, the team plays in División de Honor de Vizcaya. The club's home ground is Campo de Fútbol Arteaga.

Season to season

3 seasons in Tercera División

Famous players
 Rafael Eguzkiza

External links
Official website 

Football clubs in the Basque Country (autonomous community)
Divisiones Regionales de Fútbol clubs
Association football clubs established in 1926
1926 establishments in Spain